Gilead is an unincorporated community in Calhoun County, Illinois, United States. It was the county seat of Pike County until the southern end of the county broke up into Calhoun County. Gilead was also Calhoun County's county seat until 1847 when the county court house burnt down.

References

Former county seats in Illinois
Unincorporated communities in Calhoun County, Illinois